Jean Marie Vianney Niyomukiza (born 2 January 1998) is a Burundian long-distance runner. In 2020, he competed in the men's race at the 2020 World Athletics Half Marathon Championships held in Gdynia, Poland.

References

External links 
 

Living people
1998 births
Place of birth missing (living people)
Burundian male long-distance runners
Burundian male steeplechase runners
20th-century Burundian people
21st-century Burundian people